Liolaemus wiegmannii is a species of lizard in the family Liolaemidae. It is native to Uruguay and Ascension Island.

References

wiegmannii
Reptiles of Uruguay
Reptiles described in 1837
Taxa named by André Marie Constant Duméril
Taxa named by Gabriel Bibron